Alain Durand (born 26 June 1967) is a French former professional footballer who played as a midfielder. As of August 2021, he works as an assistant manager to Bernard Casoni at Ittihad Tanger.

Coaching career 
Durand worked as a fitness coach for Guinean club Horoya AC from 2015 to 2017. In August 2021, he was appointed as an assistant manager at Moroccan club Ittihad Tanger by Bernard Casoni.

References 

1967 births
Living people
Sportspeople from Troyes
Footballers from Grand Est
French footballers
French football managers
Association football midfielders

INF Vichy players
FC Metz players
AS Beauvais Oise players
FC Gueugnon players
ES Troyes AC players
Red Star F.C. players
French Division 3 (1971–1993) players
Ligue 1 players
Ligue 2 players
Championnat National players
French expatriate football managers
Expatriate football managers in Morocco
French expatriate sportspeople in Guinea
French expatriate sportspeople in Morocco